In United States agricultural policy, a nondegradation standard is defined in the 2002 Farm Bill provisions establishing the Conservation Security Program (CSP; P.L. 107-171, Sec. 2001) to mean the level of measures required to protect and prevent degradation of 1 or more natural resources, as determined by the Natural Resources Conservation Service. Participating farmers’ conservation security plans must address resources of concern and meet the appropriate nondegradation standard.

References 

United States Department of Agriculture
Environmental conservation